South Downs Road is a cricket ground in South Downs Road, Bowdon, Greater Manchester (formerly Cheshire). The ground is surrounded by residential housing on all sides. The ground is used by Bowdon Cricket Club. It also has facilities for field hockey and squash.

History
Bowdon Cricket Club was founded in 1856 and first played at South Downs Road in 1865, having agreed to rent the ground from the 7th Earl of Stamford. The grounds pavilion was constructed in 1874, with its original facade remaining to this day. Cheshire first played at the ground in the 1910 Minor Counties Championship against Durham. However, Cheshire would not return to the ground until 1933, when they played Denbighshire in the Minor Counties Championship, which would be the last time they would play there for 43 years. In 1939, Helen Bickham bought the ground from the 10th Earl of Stamford in memory of her brother, Ernest Bickham, and proceeded to donate it to the cricket club.

Minor counties cricket returned to the ground in 1976, when Cheshire played the Somerset Second XI in the Minor Counties Championship. From 1980 to 2001, Cheshire played annually at the ground, with the final Minor Counties Championship match hosted there seeing Shropshire. The ground held its first List A match when it was selected as a home venue for the combined Minor Counties cricket team, with the team playing Lancashire there in the 1984 Benson & Hedges Cup. Cheshire later played two List A matches there, in the 1994 NatWest Trophy against Durham and in the 1999 NatWest Trophy against Kent, with both their first-class opponents winning.

Records

List A
 Highest team total: 312/7 (50 overs) by Kent v Cheshire, 1999
 Lowest team total: 107/9 (47 overs) by Cheshire v Durham, 1994
 Highest individual innings: 123 by Nigel Llong for Kent v Cheshire, 1999
 Best bowling in an innings: 5/22 by Simon Brown for Durham v Cheshire, 1994

Gallery

See also
List of cricket grounds in England and Wales

References

External links

South Downs Road at CricketArchive
South Downs Road at ESPNcricinfo

Cricket grounds in Greater Manchester
Sports venues in Greater Manchester
Cheshire County Cricket Club
Sports venues completed in 1865